Church of the Epiphany may refer to:

In the United States:

Church of the Epiphany (Virginia), an Anglican church in Chantilly, Virginia
Church of the Epiphany (Chicago), an Episcopal church listed on the National Register of Historic Places
Church of the Epiphany (Episcopal, Manhattan), an Episcopal church established in 1833
Church of the Epiphany (Roman Catholic, Manhattan), a Roman Catholic church established in 1868
Church of the Epiphany (Los Angeles), an Episcopal church  on the National Register of Historic Places
Church of the Epiphany (Pittsburgh), a Roman Catholic church on the List of Pittsburgh History and Landmarks Foundation Historic Landmarks
Church of the Epiphany (Washington, D.C.), an Episcopal church on the National Register of Historic Places
Church of the Epiphany (Oak Hill, Virginia), an Episcopal church in Virginia
Church of the Epiphany (San Francisco), a Roman Catholic church in San Francisco
 Church of the Epiphany (Miami), a Roman Catholic Parish in Miami, Florida 

Elsewhere:

Church of the Epiphany, Gipton, an Anglican church in West Yorkshire, UK
Church of the Epiphany (Saint Petersburg), Orthodox, Russia
Church of the Epiphany (Singapore), located in Jalan Kayu, Singapore

See also
 Oxford Mission Epiphany Church, Barisal, Bangladesh